Asadullāh, also written Asadollah, Assadullah  or Asad Ullah, is a male Muslim given name meaning Lion of Allah.

The name was initially used to refer to the Islamic Prophet Muhammad's closest kinsmen Hamza and Ali.

Initially, the title was first given to Hamza ibn Abd al-Muttalib, Muhammad's uncle. After the Battle of the Trench, when Ali defeated Amr ibn Abd al-Wud, Muhammad reportedly gave Ali the name Asadullah (Lion of God) and praised him, saying 'Ali's strike on Amr ibn Abd al-Wud is greater than the worship of both mankind and jinn until the Day of Judgement.'

The name may additionally refer to:

Mirza Asadullah Baig Khan or Mirza Ghalib (1797–1869), Urdu and Persian poet from the Indian subcontinent
Abu Abdulrahman al-Bilawi, called Asadullah by Islamic State members
Mírzá Asadu’llah Fádil Mázandarání (ca. 1880–1957), Iranian Bahá'í scholar
Assadollah Hosseinpoor (1882/1883–1954), Iranian military officer
Khalifa Mohammad Asadullah (1890–1949), pioneer of the library movement in the Indian subcontinent
Asadollah Alam (1919–1978), Prime Minister of Iran
Assadollah Rashidian (active 1953), Iranian agent for foreign powers
Asadollah Lajevardi (1935–1998), Iranian politician and prison warden
Assadullah Sarwari (born 1941), Afghan politician
Asadollah Bayat-Zanjani (born 1942), Iranian theologian
Assad-Allah Imani (born 1947) Iranian Shia Cleric, Assembly of Experts Member
 Asadulla Al Galib (born 1998), Bangladeshi cricketer
Muhammad Asadullah Al-Ghalib (born 1948), Bangladeshi professor of Arabic, accused of support for Islamic militancy
Asadullah Khan (born 1984), Afghan cricketer
Asadullah Jan, Pakistani held in Guantanamo (ISN 47)
Asad Ullah, Afghan held in Guantanamo (ISN 912)
Asadullah Bhutto, Pakistani politician
Asadullah Khalid, Afghan provincial governor
Asadullah Hamdam, Afghan provincial governor
Assadullah Wafa, Afghan provincial governor
Asadullah (Afghan cricketer), Afghan cricketer
Asadullah (Pakistani cricketer), Pakistani cricketer
Asadollah Mikaeili, known as Darius Mikaeili, Iranian footballer
, Iranian Politician

See also
 Asad (given name)
 Lion of Allah
 List of Arabic theophoric names

References

Arabic masculine given names
Iranian masculine given names